Bruce Township is one of twenty townships in Benton County, Iowa, USA.  As of the 2000 census, its population was 319. As of 2018, the population is 298.

History
Bruce Township was founded in 1853.

Geography
According to the United States Census Bureau, Bruce Township covers an area of 36.07 square miles (93.42 square kilometers).

Adjacent townships
 Big Creek Township, Black Hawk County (northeast)
 Cedar Township (east)
 Jackson Township (southeast)
 Monroe Township (south)
 Clark Township, Tama County (southwest)
 Geneseo Township, Tama County (west)
 Eagle Township, Black Hawk County (northwest)

Cemeteries
The township contains Fairview Cemetery.

Major highways
  U.S. Route 218

School districts
 Union Community School District

Political districts
 Iowa's 3rd congressional district
 State House District 39
 State Senate District 20

References
 United States Census Bureau 2007 TIGER/Line Shapefiles
 United States Board on Geographic Names (GNIS)
 United States National Atlas

External links
 US-Counties.com
 City-Data.com

Townships in Benton County, Iowa
Cedar Rapids, Iowa metropolitan area
Townships in Iowa
1853 establishments in Iowa
Populated places established in 1853